Giovanni Mascardi (died 1646) was a Roman Catholic prelate who served as Bishop of Nebbio (1621–1646).

Biography
On 19 April 1621, Giovanni Mascardi was appointed during the papacy of Pope Gregory XV as Bishop of Nebbio. 
He served as Canon of the Cathedral of Mariana.
On 25 April 1621, he was consecrated bishop by Maffeo Barberini, Cardinal-Priest of Sant'Onofrio, with Diofebo Farnese, Titular Patriarch of Jerusalem, and Ulpiano Volpi, Bishop of Novara, serving as co-consecrators. 
He served as Bishop of Nebbio until his death in 1646.

References 

17th-century Italian Roman Catholic bishops
Bishops appointed by Pope Gregory XV
1646 deaths